In mathematics, Reeb stability theorem, named after Georges Reeb, asserts that if one leaf of a codimension-one foliation is closed and has finite fundamental group, then all the leaves are closed and have finite fundamental group.

Reeb local stability theorem 

The neighborhood  can be taken to be arbitrarily small.

The last statement means in particular that, in a neighborhood of the point corresponding to a compact leaf
with finite holonomy, the space of leaves is Hausdorff.
Under certain conditions the Reeb local stability theorem may replace the Poincaré–Bendixson theorem in higher dimensions.

The Reeb local stability theorem also has a version for a noncompact codimension-1 leaf.

Reeb global stability theorem 

An important problem in foliation theory is the study of the influence exerted by a compact leaf upon the global structure of a foliation. For certain classes of foliations, this influence is considerable.

This theorem holds true even when  is a foliation of a manifold with boundary, which is, a priori, tangent
on certain components of the boundary and transverse on other components. In this case it implies Reeb sphere theorem.

Reeb Global Stability Theorem is false for foliations of codimension greater than one. However, for some special kinds of foliations  one has the following global stability results:

 In the presence of a certain transverse geometric structure:

Theorem: Let  be a complete conformal foliation of codimension  of a connected manifold .

 For holomorphic foliations in complex Kähler manifold:

Theorem: Let  be a holomorphic foliation of codimension  in a compact complex Kähler manifold.

References 

 C. Camacho, A. Lins Neto: Geometric theory of foliations, Boston, Birkhauser, 1985
 I. Tamura, Topology of foliations: an introduction, Transl. of Math. Monographs, AMS, v.97, 2006, 193 p.

Notes 

Foliations